Chris Hundelt is a retired American soccer defender.

In 1981, Hundelt played all three games for the United States men's national under-20 soccer team at the 1981 FIFA World Youth Championship.  He graduated from Rosary High School in St. Louis, Missouri.  He attended Southern Illinois University Edwardsville, playing on the men’s soccer team from 1982 to 1985.  He was a 1983 Third Team All American.  On June 4, 1987, the Kansas City Comets signed Hundelt to a three-year contract.  He spent two seasons with the Comets.

References

External links
 MISL stats
 

Living people
1963 births
Soccer players from St. Louis
American soccer players
Kansas City Comets (original MISL) players
Major Indoor Soccer League (1978–1992) players
SIU Edwardsville Cougars men's soccer players
United States men's under-20 international soccer players
Association football defenders